The Taça Belo Horizonte de Juniores (or Belo Horizonte Youth Cup, in English), also known as Taça Belo Horizonte de Futebol Júnior or Taça BH, is a cup competition usually played by 36 Brazilian under-20 football teams, most of them from Minas Gerais state.

The 2006 competition's trophy was named after Telê Santana.

Format
In the first stage the 36 teams are divided in 6 groups. The top 2 of each group, plus the top four 3rd placed teams, qualify to the knockout stage. From the round of 16 to the final there are only one-leg matches, as all matches are played in Minas Gerais state.

An edition of this cup lasts about 40 days.

List of champions

U-20

U-17

Titles by team

References

External links
RSSSF Brasil
2006 edition at the Federação Mineira de Futebol (in Portuguese)

Youth football competitions in Brazil
Belo Horizonte
Under-20 association football